Trinity Historic District, also called Trinity Park, is a national historic district and residential area located near the East Campus of Duke University in Durham, North Carolina. The district encompasses 751 contributing buildings in a predominantly residential section of Durham. They were built between the 1890s and 1960 and include notable examples of Queen Anne and Bungalow / American Craftsman style architecture. Located in the district are the separately listed "Faculty Row" cottage: the Bassett House, Cranford-Wannamaker House, Crowell House, and Pegram House.  Other notable buildings include the George W. Watts School (1917), Julian S. Carr Junior High School (1922), Durham High School (1923), Durham Alliance Church (1927), Trinity Presbyterian Church (1925), Great A & P Tea Company (1927-1929), Grace Lutheran Church (c. 1950), and the former Greek Orthodox Community Church (c. 1950).

It was listed on the National Register of Historic Places in 1986, with a boundary increase in 2004 and 2008.

Notable buildings 
 Bassett House
 Cranford-Wannamaker House
 Crowell House
 Pegram House
 Powe House

Notable residents 
Notable current and former residents of Trinity Park include:
William Preston Few, first president of Duke University
Justin Tornow, dancer and choreographer

Gallery

References

Historic districts on the National Register of Historic Places in North Carolina
Queen Anne architecture in North Carolina
Historic districts in Durham, North Carolina
National Register of Historic Places in Durham County, North Carolina
Historic mansion districts
Neighborhoods in Durham, North Carolina
Second Empire architecture in North Carolina